The 2021 NCAA Division III football season was the component of the 2021 college football season organized by the NCAA at the Division III level in the United States. The regular season began on September 4 and ended on November 13.

The season's playoffs were played between November 20 and December 17, and culminated in the national championship, also known as the Stagg Bowl, at the Tom Benson Hall of Fame Stadium in Canton, Ohio.

Conference changes and new programs

Membership changes

Conference standings

Postseason

Qualification

Automatic bids (27)

At-large bids (5)

Bracket

See also
2021 NCAA Division I FBS football season
2021 NCAA Division I FCS football season
2021 NCAA Division II football season
2021 NAIA football season

Notes

References